The Supreme Administrative Court is a court in Portugal that deals with matters pertaining to administrative and fiscal legal relations. This court functions without prejudice to the jurisdiction of the Constitutional Court of Portugal.

See also
Judiciary of Portugal
Constitution of Portugal

References

External links

Administrative
Politics of Portugal
Portugal
Portugal
Courts and tribunals with year of establishment missing